Mussaenda frondosa, commonly known as the wild mussaenda or dhobi tree, is a plant of family Rubiaceae. Like most other Mussaenda species, they have a bract beneath their flowers, which in this species is white in colour.

Description
The shrub may also grow as a scandent climber. The flowers are clusters of orange-yellow tubular flowers with one of their five sepals enlarged into a white petal-like form, set among pale green, oval leaves; berries follow the bloom.  The erect, branching stem has a shrubby crown.

Distribution
Mussaenda frondosa is native to India, Nepal, Sri Lanka, Cambodia, Vietnam, Malaysia and Indonesia.

References

External links
 http://thetropicalfloweringzone.com/2014/01/23/mussaenda-frondosa/

frondosa
Flora of the Indian subcontinent
Flora of Indo-China
Flora of Malesia